The view-source URI scheme is used by some web browsers to construct URIs that result in the browser displaying the source code of a web page or other web resource.

For example, the URI view-source:https://example.com should show the source of the page located at https://example.com.

In the early internet, View Source helped people to create their own web pages, learning by example.

On 25 May 2011, the 'view-source' URI scheme was officially registered with IANA per RFC 4395.

Browser support
Firefox and Internet Explorer both supported the scheme, but support was dropped from Internet Explorer in Windows XP SP2 due to security problems. Firefox also suffered a similar security issue (by combining view-source and javascript URIs), but still supported it in Firefox 1.5 after being fixed. In 2009 a new discovered bug was fixed in Firefox 3.0.9.

References

Web browsers
URI schemes
Computer-related introductions in 2011